Say No To The World is the debut studio album by British rock band LostAlone, released on 20 March 2007. The album, the only to feature original band member Tom Kitchen, was preceded by the release of the singles "Blood is Sharp", "Unleash the Sands of All Time" and "Elysium".

The album was re-released in 2017, in the form of an iTunes deluxe edition containing ten songs previously released as B-sides, and a limited edition translucent green vinyl. Lung Space: The Lost Tapes, an EP containing songs previously only released in international territories, was issued alongside the re-release.

Track listing

External links
Official Website
Official Forum

References 

2007 debut albums
LostAlone albums
Sire Records albums
Warner Records albums